The Sindh Police, is a law enforcement agency established in 1843 under a proclamation issued by Sir Charles Napier, who became the conqueror of the State of Sindh by defeating the forces of the Talpur rulers at the battle of Miyani near Hyderabad on 20 March 1843. 
Ever since its inception, the organization was raised on the model of the Royal Irish Constabulary to maintain law and order and law enforcement in Sindh, Pakistan. The department serves an area of ~140,914 km2., and has about ~128,500 police officers and staff to serve in the department. Ghulam Nabi Memon is the current Inspector-General, appointed in June 2022.

The Sindh Police has been fictionalized as well as dramatized in numerous movies, novels, dramas, and television shows through its history.

History

After becoming the Governor of Sindh, General Sir Charles Napier established a policy system based on the pattern of the Royal Irish Constabulary in 1843. British Indian Army Officers closely supervised and controlled the force which was consequently more disciplined, efficient and less corrupt. Influenced by the success of Napier's police, the Court of Directors of the East India Company suggested that a common system of police be established on the pattern of the Irish Constabulary.

The British Indian Government set up a Police Commission headed by Mr. H.M.Court in 1860. One of the policy directives to the Police Commission of 1860 was that "though the duties of the police should be entirely civil, not military, the organization and discipline of the police should be similar to those of a military body". The present police system in Pakistan has been established under this Charter. At the time of the British Indian Police there was a famous Superintendent of Police from Pirdad (Hazro) in Punjab named Muhammad Umar Khan, who was much decorated.
In October 2010 the government announced that Sindh Police had been given the approval to use and had received equipment to utilise phone-tracking technology to help them tackle kidnapping cases and corruption on the streets of Karachi.

Composition 
Sindh Police is divided into three zones. Each zone is headed by Additional Inspector General of Police. Each Zone is in return consists of one to three divisions who are headed by Deputy Inspector General of Police. These divisions are each of 3 to 7 districts who are led by Senior Superintendent of Police. Currently Karachi, Hyderabad and Sukkur are the three main zones of Sindh Police.

IGPs of Sindh Police

SINDH POLICE ORGANISATION

Activities 

The Sindh Police has been actively involved in countering human trafficking, drug trade, solving criminal cases (such as murder and abduction).

Designations

Designations of Sindh Police are as follows:

Posts
SHO, SDPO, DPO, CPO, RPO and PPO are posts, not ranks. So you may see a lower rank acting as a higher post for some time.

Special Security Unit
The Special Security Unit (SSU) is one of the specialized counterterrorism and security units of the Sindh Police. It performs the function of counterterrorism operations and provide security to important personalities and institutions. It is a Karachi based unit of the Sindh Police, Pakistan and its operational jurisdiction extends to entire area of Sindh. The SSU was established due to the increased security and counterterrorism challenges in the country. It meets the international standards of counterterrorism training and has been directed to deal with the terrorist intimidations. The unit reports to IG Sindh and DIGP Security Mr. Lt (r) Maqsood Ahmed is the founding head of the unit.

Controversies

IG Sindh appointment 
The Government of Pakistan, in consultation with the Governor of Sindh, appointed Mushtaq Ahmad Mahar as Inspector General of Police, replacing Syed Kaleem Imam at the request of Sindh's provincial government due to his perceived insubordination and failure to control increasing crime rates in Karachi.

Mazar-e-Quaid incident 
The Pakistan Democratic Movement conducted a large political rally in the port city of Karachi near the Mazar-e-Quaid on October 18, 2020. During the rally, former Prime Minister of Pakistan Nawaz Sharif addressed the leader of the Pakistani Army, saying, "General Qamar Javed Bajwa, you packed up our government, which was working well, and put the nation and the country at the altar of your wishes." This speech was censored when broadcast by Pakistani media on the government's orders. Some news analysts believed that Sharif's open criticism of Bajwa was unlikely to be taken lightly.

That night, officials of the Inter-Services Intelligence (ISI) and Pakistan Rangers allegedly abducted Inspector General Mahar and forced him to sign an order to arrest prominent opposition leader Muhammad Safdar Awan, Sharif's son-in-law, for "violating the sanctity of Quaid's mausoleum" during the rally. The sequence of events, according to Al Jazeera, was that federal intelligence agencies grew frustrated because they were unable to immediately arrest Safdar, so they sent nine paramilitary Ranger vehicles to Mahar's house at 4am on October 19 to bring him to a meeting with the sector commander, where they demanded that he authorise Safdar's arrest. Awan was released on bail the same day.

To protest this treatment, Mahar and other senior officials in the Sindh police department applied for leave en masse, though they subsequently relented when Qamar Javed Bajwa, the head of Pakistani armed forces, ordered an inquiry into the incident. The Federal Minister of Information, Shibli Faraz, called this protest by the Sindh police a "quasi-mutiny".

According to former Inspector General of Police Akhtar Hassan Khan, the events were a series of blunders. He said that Safdar's behavior at the mausoleum was inappropriate and could be considered a legal offence, but not a cognizable one, meaning that his arrest should have been preceded by a court warrant. He condemned the abduction and intimidation of Mahar. According to Al Jazeera, while all the reports of Mahar's mistreatment were unlikely to be true, such behavior on the part of federal intelligence officials amounted to coercion. Mazhar Abbas of thenews.com.pk reported that Prime Minister of Pakistan Imran Khan considered the kidnapping and its aftermath to be media-created hype and a non-issue, laughing over the incident.

Impact and legacy 
According to Mazhar Abbas, the issues raised by such intra-institutional conflict and the unprecedented police revolt are unlikely to be resolved quickly. Three inquiries were made, one by the head of the armed forces, another by a committee of the Sindh provincial government, and a third, limited one by the federal government. The Civil Society filed a petition in Pakistan's Supreme Court seeking to restrain the federal government and its armed agencies from illegitimate interference in provincial autonomy.

As per a report by an inquiry conducted on the orders of Chief of Army Staff (COAS) General Qamar Javed Bajwa, Mahar was not kidnapped but "summoned overzealously" since the ISI and Pakistan Rangers were allegedly under great public pressure. As per the recommendations of same inquiry, the ISI and Ranger officials concerned in the incident were removed from any ongoing assignments that might cause misunderstandings with the Sindh Police.

Weaponry

The Sindh Police uses a variety of weaponry. However, these are a few of the most common weapons used.

AK-47/Type 56
Heckler & Koch G3
Heckler & Koch MP5 (MP5K version also widely used)
Beretta M92
Glock pistols
RPG-7
Tear gas
Riot shields
Flak Jackets

Vehicles

The most common vehicles used by the Sindh Police are:

Toyota Hilux Single/Double cabin (REVO/Vigo version), Toyota Corolla (2010-2018 version), Mohafiz Internal Security Vehicle, APCs, troop carriers, water cannons.

The Sindh Police is not known to use any aircraft; however, there have been rumours that the police use locally produced UAVs such as the SATUMA Jasoos, for reconnaissance.

POLICE HOSPITALS IN SINDH 

Sindh Police Hospital Garden Karachi

Regional Police Hospital Hyderabad
Regional Police Health Center Sukkur

Citizens Police Liaimtee
The Citizens Police Liaison Committee (CPLC) is a public-private relationship, self-funding, Non-Political Statutory organization, established under a notification by the Sindh government. The CPLC provides relief and technical support to victims of crime. Fakhruddin G. Ebrahim established the Citizen Police Liaison Committee (CPLC) in 1989, the CPLC works in Karachi and assists citizens in registering the (FIR) if it is refused by police for some reason.

The public takes initiative as a volunteer and report the failing law and order situations to the law enforcement agencies to achieve its objectives.

Organization structure
CPLC is distributed among 6 district offices in Karachi, one district office at Hyderabad, decided to establish a district office in Sukkur, where as its main office is located in the Governor House Sindh. A Police core group was established by the IGP Sindh to cooperate among Police and the citizens.

CPLC had previously Ahmed Chinoy as its chief and new chief Zubair Habib has been appointed as a new chief of CPLC.
CPLC has established 1102 as its help-line. Makhdoom Ali Khan was member of the Advisory Board of the Citizens Police Liaison Committee (CPLC).

See also
Balochistan Police
Enforced disappearances in Pakistan
Law enforcement in Pakistan
Muhammad Safdar Awan
Khyber Pakhtunkhwa Police
Punjab Police

References

External links
 

Provincial law enforcement agencies of Pakistan
Government of Sindh
 
Government agencies established in 1843
1843 establishments in British India